The First Kalyan Singh ministry is the council of ministers in headed by Chief Minister Kalyan Singh, which was formed after 1991 Uttar Pradesh Legislative Assembly election, where the BJP won 221 seats out of total 425 seats under his leadership. Kalyan Singh the leader of the party in the assembly was sworn in as Chief Minister of Uttar Pradesh on 24 June 1991. Here is the list of members of his ministry:

Council of Ministers

Cabinet Ministers

Ministers of state (Independent Charge)

Ministers of state

References 

1991 in Indian politics
Uttar Pradesh ministries
Bharatiya Janata Party state ministries
Bharatiya Janata Party of Uttar Pradesh
1991 establishments in Uttar Pradesh
Cabinets established in 1991
1992 disestablishments in India
Cabinets disestablished in 1992